Lymburn is an unincorporated community in northern Alberta, Canada within the County of Grande Prairie No. 1.

Localities in the County of Grande Prairie No. 1